Mark Lamb (born July 14, 1972) is an American law enforcement officer who has served as the sheriff of Pinal County, Arizona since 2017. A member of the Republican Party, Lamb previously served in the Salt River Pima–Maricopa Indian Community police department.

Career 
Lamb worked for the police department of the Salt River Pima–Maricopa Indian Community for six years. In 2012, he joined the Pinal County Sheriff's Office. In 2017, Lamb was elected to succeed Paul Babeu as Pinal County Sheriff. Lamb is a Republican.

In a 2021 interview, Lamb described his role as sheriff as involving protecting people from "bad guys" and from "government overreach", and maintaining the rule of law. Lamb enforces law selectively, taking an uncompromising approach to immigration while adopting anti-government rhetoric in relation to COVID-19 vaccination mandates and the legitimacy of the 2020 United States presidential election. He opposes all restrictions on the right to keep and bear arms.

Prior to its cancellation in 2020, Lamb frequently appeared on the TV series Live PD. Lamb also hosted Live PD: Wanted, a spinoff show. In 2019, he also featured in Season 5 of 60 Days In, in which seven volunteers went undercover in the Pinal County Jail for 60 days to collect insight into jail operations. Lamb frequently appears on Fox News and Newsmax TV.

In November 2019, Lamb called for increased security along the Mexico–United States border to combat drug cartels from harming U.S. National Parks.

In May 2020, Lamb stated he would not enforce a stay-at-home order during the COVID-19 pandemic on the basis that he believed it was unconstitutional. In June 2020, he tested positive for COVID-19 a week before his scheduled appearance at the White House for Donald Trump's signing of executive order 13925.

In July 2020, in response to the protests following the murder of George Floyd, Lamb announced his intention to form a civilian posse of non-felon volunteers with four hours of training in legal guidelines and basic police tactics. No protests occurred in Pinal County in summer 2020.

In 2018, Lamb established the American Sheriff Foundation, a charity. In August 2020, the Arizona Republic reported that the charity had raised more than $50,000 but left at least $18,000 unaccounted for and filed largely blank tax filings.

In 2020, Lamb spoke at a convention of the Constitutional Sheriffs and Peace Officers Association, an organization that holds that sheriffs are the supreme legal authority in the United States and are not required to enforce laws they believe to be unconstitutional. He has also appeared alongside the Federation for American Immigration Reform, which is described as a hate group by the Southern Poverty Law Center.

Lamb ran unopposed for re-election in November 2020 after successfully suing to remove his competition from the ballot.

Lamb is a supporter of the Stop the Steal movement. Following the 2021 United States Capitol attack by supporters of Donald Trump, he spoke at a rally where he said the riot was not Trump's fault but rather caused by "the other issues that have happened – the Hillary Clintons that have gone unpunished". He later described the rioters as "very loving, Christian people."

In February 2021, Lamb co-founded (with Republican strategist Nathan Sproul and others) Protect America Now, a coalition of 69 sheriffs with the stated purpose of "educating Americans about how our Sheriffs and the law enforcement community are standing for our Constitution and law and order". In May 2021, Lamb launched the American Sheriff Network, a subscription service providing videos showing sheriffs and their deputies carrying out their duties.

Lamb is the author of American Sheriff: Traditional Values in a Modern World, which was self-published.

In December 2022, a spokesperson for Lamb said he was considering running for the U.S. Senate in 2024.

Personal life
Lamb spent much of his childhood in Hawaii, and also lived in the Philippines, Panama and Argentina. He moved to Arizona in 2003, after his paintball business in Utah failed and he filed for bankruptcy. Before his career in law enforcement, he also worked in pest control.

Lamb's wife, Janel, is the author of a book entitled The Sheriff's Wife, and frequently appears alongside him at public events. On December 16, 2022, Lamb's son and infant granddaughter died in a traffic collision in Gilbert, Arizona.

Lamb is a member of the Church of Jesus Christ of Latter-day Saints.

References

External links
 
 

1970s births
21st-century American politicians
Arizona Republicans
Arizona sheriffs
Latter Day Saints from Arizona
Living people
People from Pinal County, Arizona